The Beijing Changchun Temple is a Buddhist temple in Xuanwu District, Beijing, China. The temple also houses the Xuanwu Cultural Museum.

History
The temple was first built by the Wanli Emperor's mother in 1592 during the Ming dynasty. The temple was heavily damaged by the 1679 Sanhe-Pinggu earthquake, and was never really restored to its former glory, and later became a storage space for coffins. Following the establishment of the People's Republic of China in 1949, the temple was transformed into housing. In 2001, the temple was put under cultural protection and went through an extensive renovation costing nearly 200 million RMB. In 2005 the temple reopened as the Xuanwu Cultural Museum.

Layout
The temple is organized around one main courtyard which contains three halls. Adjoining the temple is the Xuanwu Municipal Bureau of Tourism.

Location
The temple is located at 9 Changchun Jie in Xuanwu District, Beijing.

References
Plaque at the temple

Buddhist temples in Beijing